The 1990 Greek Ice Hockey Championship season was the second season of the Greek Ice Hockey Championship. The Aris Saloniki Penguins won the league title for the second consecutive season.

External links
List of champions on icehockey.gr

Greek Ice Hockey Championship seasons
Greek
Ice